CoviVac may refer to:

Vaccine 
 CoviVac (Russia COVID-19 vaccine), inactivated COVID-19 vaccine developed by the Chumakov Centre in Russia
 Covivac (Vietnam COVID-19 vaccine), viral vector COVID-19 vaccine developed by Institute of Vaccines and Medical Biologicals in Vietnam, later named NDV-HXP-S
 COVI-VAC (U.S. COVID-19 vaccine), codenamed CDX-005; live-attenuated COVID-19 vaccine developed by Codagenix Inc.; produced at the Serum Institute of India

See also 

 COVID-19 vaccine
 
 Covi (disambiguation)
 VAC (disambiguation)